Akhtynsky District is an administrative and municipal district (raion), one of the forty-one in the Republic of Dagestan, Russia. Its administrative center is the rural locality (a selo) of Akhty. As of the 2010 Census, the total population of the district was 32,604, with the population of Akhty accounting for 41.1% of that number.

Geography
The Samur River flows in the north of the district from west to east. The Akhtychay River flows from southwest to northeast of the district and into the Samur River in Akhty. Gelmets-Akhtynsky Ridge is located between the two rivers.

Administrative and municipal status
Within the framework of administrative divisions, Akhtynsky District is one of the forty-one in the Republic of Dagestan. The district is divided into four selsoviets which comprise nineteen rural localities.  As a municipal division, the district is incorporated as Akhtynsky Municipal District. Its four selsoviets are incorporated as thirteen rural settlements within the municipal district. The selo of Akhty serves as the administrative center of both the administrative and municipal district.

Demographics
Ethnically, all of the rural localities in the district are Lezgian, with the exception of the selo of Khnov, which is populated by the Rutul people.

References

Notes

Sources

Districts of Dagestan